A T-shirt (also spelled tee-shirt or tee shirt), or tee for short, is a style of fabric shirt named after the T shape of its body and sleeves. Traditionally, it has short sleeves and a round neckline, known as a crew neck, which lacks a collar. T-shirts are generally made of a stretchy, light, and inexpensive fabric and are easy to clean. The T-shirt evolved from undergarments used in the 19th century and, in the mid-20th century, transitioned from undergarment to general-use casual clothing.

They are typically made of cotton textile in a stockinette or jersey knit, which has a distinctively pliable texture compared to shirts made of woven cloth. Some modern versions have a body made from a continuously knitted tube, produced on a circular knitting machine, such that the torso has no side seams. The manufacture of T-shirts has become highly automated and may include cutting fabric with a laser or a water jet.

T-shirts are inexpensive to produce and are often part of fast fashion, leading to outsized sales of T-shirts compared to other attire. For example, two billion T-shirts are sold per year in the United States, or the average person from Sweden buys nine T-shirts a year. Production processes vary but can be environmentally intensive, and include the environmental impact caused by their materials, such as cotton which is both pesticide and water intensive.

History
Simple, T-shaped top garments have been a part of human clothing since ancient times; garments similar to the T-shirt worn earlier in history are generally called tunics.

The modern T-shirt evolved from undergarments used in the 19th century. First, the one-piece union suit underwear was cut into separate top and bottom garments, with the top long enough to tuck under the waistband of the bottoms. With and without buttons, they were adopted by miners and stevedores during the late 19th century as a convenient covering for hot environments.

As slip-on garments without buttons, the earliest T-shirt dates back to sometime between the 1898 Spanish–American War and 1904, when the Cooper Underwear Company ran a magazine ad announcing a new product for bachelors. In the "before" photo, a man averts his eyes from the camera as if embarrassed; he has lost all the buttons on his undershirt and has safety-pinned its flaps together. In the "after" photo, a virile gentleman  wears a "bachelor undershirt" stretchy enough to be pulled over the head. "No safety pins — no buttons — no needle — no thread", ran the slogan aimed at men with no wives who lacked sewing skills.In 1913, the U.S. Navy first issued them as undergarments. These were a crew-necked, short-sleeved, white cotton undershirt to be worn under a uniform. It became common for sailors and Marines in work parties, the early submarines, and tropical climates to remove their uniform jacket, thus wearing (and soiling) only the undershirt. They soon became popular as a bottom layer of clothing for workers in various industries, including agriculture. The T-shirt was easily fitted, easily cleaned, and inexpensive; for those reasons, it became the shirt of choice for young boys. Boys' shirts were made in various colors and patterns. The word T-shirt became part of American English by the 1920s, and appeared in the Merriam-Webster Dictionary.

By the Great Depression, the T-shirt was often the default garment to be worn when doing farm or ranch chores, as well as other times when modesty called for a torso covering but conditions called for lightweight fabrics. Following World War II, it was worn by Navy men as undergarments and slowly became common to see veterans wearing their uniform trousers with their T-shirts as casual clothing. The shirts became even more popular in the 1950s after Marlon Brando wore one in A Streetcar Named Desire, finally achieving status as fashionable, stand-alone, outerwear garments. Often boys wore them while doing chores and playing outside, eventually opening up the idea of wearing them as general-purpose casual clothing.

Printed T-shirts were in limited use by 1942 when an Air Corps Gunnery School T-shirt appeared on the cover of Life magazine. In the 1960s, printed T-shirts gained popularity for self-expression as well as for advertisements, protests, and souvenirs.

Current versions are available in many different designs and fabrics, and styles include crew-neck and V-neck shirts. T-shirts are among the most worn garments of clothing used today. T-shirts are especially popular with branding for companies or merchandise, as they are inexpensive to make and purchase.

Trends

T-shirts were originally worn as undershirts, but are now worn frequently as the only piece of clothing on the top half of the body, other than possibly a brassiere or, rarely, a waistcoat (vest). T-shirts have also become a medium for self-expression and advertising, with any imaginable combination of words, art and photographs on display.

A T-shirt typically extends to the waist. Variants of the T-shirt, such as the V-neck, have been developed. Hip hop fashion calls for tall-T shirts which may extend down to the knees. A similar item is the T-shirt dress or T-dress, a dress-length T-shirt that can be worn without pants. Long T-shirts are also sometimes worn by women as nightgowns. A 1990s trend in women's clothing involved tight-fitting cropped T-shirt or crop tops short enough to reveal the midriff. Another less popular trend is wearing a short-sleeved T-shirt of a contrasting color over a long-sleeved T-shirt, which is known as layering. T-shirts that are tight to the body are called fitted, tailored or baby doll T-shirts.

With the rise of social media and video sharing sites also came numerous tutorials on DIY T-shirt projects. These videos typically provided instructions on how to modify an old shirt into a new, more fashionable form.

Expressive messages
Since the 1960s, T-shirts have flourished as a form of personal expression. Screen printed T-shirts have been a standard form of marketing for major American consumer products, such as Coca-Cola and Mickey Mouse, since the 1970s. It has also been commonly used to commemorate an event or to make a political or personal statement. Since the 1990s, it has become common practice for companies of all sizes to produce T-shirts with their corporate logos or messages as part of their overall advertising campaigns. Since the late 1980s and especially the 1990s, T-shirts with prominent designer-name logos have become popular, especially with teenagers and young adults. These garments allow consumers to flaunt their taste for designer brands in an inexpensive way, in addition to being decorative. Examples of designer T-shirt branding include Calvin Klein, FUBU, Ralph Lauren, American Apparel, and The Gap.  These examples also include representations of rock bands, among other obscure pop-culture references. Licensed T-shirts are also extremely popular. Movie and TV T-shirts can have images of the actors, logos, and funny quotations from the movie or TV show. Often, the most popular T-shirts are those that characters wore in the film itself (e.g., Bubba Gump from Forrest Gump and Vote For Pedro from Napoleon Dynamite).

Designer Katharine Hamnett, in the early 1980s, pioneered outsize T-shirts with large-print slogans. The early first decade of the 21st century saw the renewed popularity of T-shirts with slogans and designs with a strong inclination to the humorous and/or ironic. The trend has only increased later in this decade, embraced by celebrities, such as Britney Spears and Paris Hilton, and reflected back on them, too ('Team Aniston'). The political and social statements that T-shirts often display have become, since the first decade of the 21st century, one of the reasons that they have so deeply permeated different levels of culture and society. The statements also may be found to be offensive, shocking, or pornographic to some. Examples of T-shirt store known for using offensive and shocking messages T-Shirt Hell. Many different organizations have caught on to the statement-making trend, including chain and independent stores, websites, and schools.

A popular phrase on the front of demonstrating the popularity of T-shirts among tourists is the humorous phrase "I went to _ and all I got was this lousy T-shirt." Examples include "My parents went to Las Vegas and all I got was this lousy T-shirt." T-shirt exchange is an activity where people trade the T-shirts that they are wearing.

Artists like Bill Beckley, Glen Baldridge and Peter Klashorst use T-shirts in their work. Models such as Victoria Beckham and Gisele Bundchen wore T-shirts through the 2000s. Paris Fashion Week 2014 featured a grunge style T-shirt.

Decoration

In the early 1950s, several companies based in Miami, Florida, started to decorate T-shirts with different resort names and various characters. The first company was Tropix Togs, under founder Sam Kantor, in Miami. They were the original licensee for Walt Disney characters in 1976 including Mickey Mouse and Davy Crockett. Later, other companies expanded into the T-shirt printing business, including Sherry Manufacturing Company, also based in Miami. Sherry was founded in 1948 by its owner and founder Quentin H. Sandler as a screen printer of Souvenir Scarf's to the souvenir resort market. Shortly, the company evolved into one of the largest screen printed resort and licensed apparel companies in the United States. The company now (2018) runs automatic Screen Print presses and produces up to 10,000 to 20,000 T-shirts each day.

In the 1960s, the ringer T-shirt appeared and became a staple fashion for youth and rock-n-rollers. The decade also saw the emergence of tie-dyeing and screen-printing on the basic T-shirt and the T-shirt became a medium for wearable art, commercial advertising, souvenir messages, and protest art messages. Psychedelic art poster designer Warren Dayton pioneered several political, protest, and pop-culture art printed large and in color on T-shirts featuring images of Cesar Chavez, political cartoons, and other cultural icons in an article in the Los Angeles Times magazine in late 1969 (ironically, the clothing company quickly cancelled the experimental line, fearing there would not be a market). In the late 1960s, Richard Ellman, Robert Tree, Bill Kelly, and Stanley Mouse set up the Monster Company in Mill Valley, California, to produce fine art designs expressly for T-shirts. Monster T-shirts often feature emblems and motifs associated with the Grateful Dead and marijuana culture. Additionally, one of the most popular symbols to emerge from the political turmoil of the 1960s were T-shirts bearing the face of Marxist revolutionary Che Guevara.

Today, many notable and memorable T-shirts produced in the 1970s have become ensconced in pop culture. Examples include the bright yellow happy face T-shirts, The Rolling Stones tops with their "tongue and lips" logo, and Milton Glaser's iconic "I ♥ N Y” design. In the mid-1980s, the white T-shirt became fashionable after the actor Don Johnson wore it with an Armani suit in Miami Vice.

V-Neck 
A V-neck T-shirt has a V-shaped neckline, as opposed to the round neckline of the more common crew neck shirt (also called a U-neck). V-necks were introduced so that the neckline of the shirt does not show when worn beneath an outer shirt, as would that of a crew neck shirt.

Screen printing

The most common form of commercial T-shirt decoration is screen printing. In screen printing, a design is separated into individual colors. Plastisol or water based inks are applied to the shirt through mesh screens which limits the areas where ink is deposited. In most commercial T-shirt printing, the specific colors in the design are used. To achieve a wider color spectrum with a limited number of colors, process printing (using only cyan, magenta, yellow and black ink) or simulated process (using only white, black, red, green, blue, and gold ink) is effective. Process printing is best suited for light colored shirts. The simulated process is best suited for dark colored shirts.

In 1959, the invention of plastisol provided an ink more durable and stretchable than water-based ink, allowing much more variety in T-shirt designs. Very few companies continue to use water-based inks on their shirts. The majority of companies that create shirts prefer plastisol due to the ability to print on varying colors without the need for color adjustment at the art level.

Specialty inks trend in and out of fashion and include shimmer, puff, discharge, and chino based inks. A metallic foil can be heat pressed and stamped onto any plastisol ink. When combined with shimmer ink, metallics give a mirror like effect wherever the previously screened plastisol ink was applied. Specialty inks are more expensive to purchase as well as screen and tend to appear on garments in boutiques.

Other methods of decoration used on T-shirts include airbrush, applique, embroidery, impressing or embossing, and the ironing on of either flock lettering, heat transfers, or dye-sublimation transfers. Laser printers are capable of printing on plain paper using a special toner containing sublimation dyes which can then be permanently heat-transferred to T-shirts.

In the 1980s, thermochromatic dyes were used to produce T-shirts that changed color when subjected to heat. The Global Hypercolour brand of these was a common sight on the streets of the UK for a few years but has since mostly disappeared. These were also very popular in the United States among teenagers in the late 1980s. A downside of color-change garments is that the dyes can easily be damaged, especially by washing in warm water or dye other clothes during washing.

Tie dye
Tie dye originated in India, Japan, Jamaica, and Africa as early as the sixth century. Some forms of tie dye are Bandhani (the oldest known technique) used in Indian cultures, and Shibori primarily used in Japanese cultures. It was not until the 1960s that tie dye was introduced to America during the hippie movement.

Heat transfer vinyl (HTV)
Another form of T-shirt decoration is heat transfer vinyl, also called HTV. HTV is a polyurethane material that allows apparel designers to create unique layered designs using a specialized software program. Once the design is created, it is then cut through the material using a vinyl cutter (or Cut n Press) machine.

There are dozens of different colors available, as well as glitter, reflective, and now even unique patterns (such as mermaid skin) which come in rolls and sheets.

After the design is cut, there is a process called “weeding” whereby the areas of the design that do not represent the design are picked away from the transfer sheet and removed so that the intended design remains. HTV is typically smooth to the touch and does not feel rubbery or stiff. The edges are typically clean cut and produce high contrast.

Designers can also create multiple color designs, or multi-layered designs using HTV. This process would be done in the design software before the design is sent to the cutter for the different materials. A heat press is then used to apply pressure and heat to the vinyl so that the material permanently adheres to the garment. The temperature and pressure vary according to the manufacturers specifications.

Dye-sublimation printing 
Dye-sublimation printing is a direct-to-garment digital printing technology using full color artwork to transfer images to polyester and polymer-coated substrate based T-shirts. Dye-sublimation (also commonly referred to as all-over printing) came into widespread use in the 21st century, enabling some designs previously impossible. Printing with unlimited colors using large CMYK printers with special paper and ink is possible, unlike screen printing which requires screens for each color of the design. All-over print T-shirts have solved the problem with color fading and the vibrancy is higher than most standard printing methods but requires synthetic fabrics for the ink to take hold. The key feature of dye-sublimated clothing is that the design is not printed on top of the garment, but permanently dyed into the threads of the shirt, ensuring that it will never fade.

Dye-sublimation is economically viable for small-quantity printing; the unit cost is similar for short or long production runs. Screen printing has higher setup costs, requiring large numbers to be produced to be cost-effective, and the unit cost is higher.

Solid ink is changed into a gas without passing through a liquid phase (sublimation), using heat and pressure. The design is first produced in a computer image file format such as jpg, gif, png, or any other. It is printed on a purpose-made computer printer ( most commonly Epson or Ricoh brands) using large heat presses to vaporize the ink directly into the fabric. By mid-2012, this method had become widely used for T-shirts.

Other methods 
Other methods of decorating shirts include using paints, markers, fabric transfer crayons, dyes and spray paint. Some techniques that can be used include sponging, stenciling, daubing, stamping, screen printing, bleaching, and many more. Some new T-shirt creators have used designs with multiple advanced techniques, which includes using glow-in-the-dark inks, heat-sensitive fabrics, foil printing and all-over printing. Other designers like Robert Geller, a German-born American fashion designer, has created a T-shirt collection which feature oversized graphic T-shirts made from super soft jersey materials. Alexander Wang came out with variations of T-shirts from oversized scoop necks, tanks to striped, slouchy rayon jerseys. Terence Koh T-shirts feature an upside down portrait with a real bullet hole hand.

See also 
 Concert T-shirt
 Inkjet transfer
 Kit (association football)
 Polo shirt
 Raglan sleeve
 Wet T-shirt contest

References

External links 

 
 

20th-century fashion
21st-century fashion
American fashion
Canadian fashion
Casual wear
History of clothing (Western fashion)
Tops (clothing)
 
Western wear